The House of Lukarić or Lukarević (in Italian Luccari) was a noble family of the Republic of Ragusa.

Besides "Lukarić" the names of the long-extinct noble family included "Luccari" and "de Lucaris", found in Zadar in the year 1283. Šimun Lukarić probably belonged to another branch. Some of the Lukarić family names which occur in the Dalmatian nobility listings of 1553 in the city of Split, may belong to the family. The coats of arms (of both sexes) that are available do not permit this point to be determined.

Notable Members
Frano Lukarić (1541-1598), Ragusan poet
Jakov Lukarević (1551-1615), historian, diplomat, politician and Rector of Ragusa (1613)
Pietro Luccari (died 1679), bishop of Ston (1664-1679)
Ivan Lukarić (1621-1709), writer

See also 
 Republic of Ragusa
 Dubrovnik
 Dalmatia
 Post-Roman patriciates

Sources 
Heyer von Rosenfeld, Carl Georg Friedrich - "Der Adel des Königreichs Dalmatien", in Siebmacher Bd. IV / 3, Nürnberg 1873, Seite 55 (Tafel 36).

References 

Ragusan noble families